St. Rose is an unincorporated community in Mercer County, in the U.S. state of Ohio.

History
St. Rose was platted in 1854. A post office called Saint Rosa was established in 1878, and remained in operation until 1905.

References

Unincorporated communities in Mercer County, Ohio
Unincorporated communities in Ohio